The 2009 European Mixed Curling Championship was held from September 26 to October 3, 2009 at the Curling Hall Roztyly in Prague.

Scotland, skipped by Tom Brewster won its second title, defeating Denmark in the final.

Teams
The teams are as follows:

Standings

Playoffs
Semi final challenge games:
 5-3 
 7-2

External links
Event website

 
2009 in curling
2009 in Czech sport
Sports competitions in Prague
European Mixed Curling Championship
International curling competitions hosted by the Czech Republic
September 2009 sports events in Europe
October 2009 sports events in Europe
2000s in Prague